WBZO (103.1 FM) is a rock-leaning classic hits radio station owned by Connoisseur Media and licensed to Bay Shore, New York. The station's studios are located at Airport Plaza in Farmingdale, New York, and its transmitter is located on Freeman Avenue in Islip, New York.

History
103.1 FM first signed on the air in February 1993 as WBSI, broadcasting from studios located on Sunrise Highway in Bay Shore and playing oldies from the 1950s, 1960s, and 1970s. The WBSI call letters were dropped only a few months after the station signed on because 106.1 WBLI complained the WBSI call sign was too similar and would cause confusion in the Arbitron ratings.

WBZO — along with WHLI, WKJY, and WWSK — was sold by Barnstable Broadcasting to Connoisseur Media effective July 3, 2012 for $23 million.

On May 15, 2015, WBZO rebranded as "103.1 Max FM".

In September 2022, the on-air staff was let go due to budget cuts. WBZO is now running automated.

References

External links

BZO
Classic hits radio stations in the United States
Radio stations established in 1993
1993 establishments in New York (state)
Mass media in Suffolk County, New York
Connoisseur Media radio stations